KXGE (102.3 FM) is a radio station broadcasting a classic rock format serving the Dubuque, Iowa, United States, community. The station is owned by Townsquare Media and licensed to Townsquare License, LLC. 102.3 at one time broadcast a country music format as KXKX ("Kix 102").

On August 30, 2013, a deal was announced in which Cumulus Media would swap its stations in Dubuque (including KXGE) and Poughkeepsie, New York to Townsquare Media in exchange for Peak Broadcasting's Fresno, California stations. The deal was part of Cumulus' acquisition of Dial Global; Townsquare, Peak, and Dial Global were all controlled by Oaktree Capital Management. The sale to Townsquare was completed on November 14, 2013.

References

External links

XGE
Classic rock radio stations in the United States
Townsquare Media radio stations